The 2013 Rugby League Asian Cup is the second staging of the Rugby League Asian Cup which was contested by Thailand and the Philippines. Japan was originally set to participate in the tournament but later withdrew due to lack of available players. The tournament was also originally set to be held at the Challenger Field in Clark in Angeles, Pampanga but was moved to San Narciso, Zambales after the owner of the original venue, the Philippine Air Force, cancelled the booking of the tournament organizers because the field was needed for military maneuvers.

Match details

Asian Cup
Rugby League Asian Cup
Rugby league matches
Sports in Zambales
Rugby League Asian Cup
Rugby league competitions in the Philippines
October 2013 sports events in the Philippines